Tidestromia suffruticosa, the shrubby honeysweet, is a perennial plant in the family Amaranthaceae of the southwestern United States and northeastern Mexican deserts. It has one of the highest rates of photosynthesis ever recorded. It flowers from April to December.

Subtaxa
The following varieties are accepted:
Tidestromia suffruticosa var. oblongifolia (S.Watson) Sánch.Pino & Flores Olv.
Tidestromia suffruticosa var. suffruticosa

References

Amaranthaceae
Flora of Arizona
Flora of the South-Central United States
Flora of Northeastern Mexico
Flora without expected TNC conservation status